Stephen Brunt (born 21 July 1960) is a paralympic athlete from Great Britain competing mainly in category T12 distance runner events.

Stephen has run at four Paralympics.  He competed in the 5000m in both the 1988 and 1992 Summer Paralympics, but it was in the marathon where he won medals, he won gold in 1988 and defended it in 1992, he failed to medal in the 1996 Summer Paralympics but came back and won a silver medal in the 2000 Summer Paralympics.

References

Paralympic athletes of Great Britain
Athletes (track and field) at the 1988 Summer Paralympics
Athletes (track and field) at the 1992 Summer Paralympics
Athletes (track and field) at the 1996 Summer Paralympics
Athletes (track and field) at the 2000 Summer Paralympics
Paralympic gold medalists for Great Britain
Paralympic silver medalists for Great Britain
Living people
Medalists at the 1988 Summer Paralympics
Medalists at the 1992 Summer Paralympics
Medalists at the 2000 Summer Paralympics
1960 births
Paralympic medalists in athletics (track and field)
British male marathon runners
Visually impaired marathon runners
Paralympic marathon runners